The Beresford Republic is the weekly newspaper of Beresford, South Dakota.  The newspaper is published every Thursday.

History
According to the Beresford Centennial Book (published in 1984), the Beresford Republic was founded by a Mr. Stroud in Elk Point, South Dakota.  It was originally published under the title, the Union County Republican.  The first volume of that newspaper still survives in private hands and was put on display at the history exhibit during the celebration of the 125th anniversary of the incorporation of the city of Beresford, South Dakota in July 2009.  The first issue of that newspaper was published on August 2, 1894.  H. A. Sturges was reported to have owned the newspaper for twenty-seven years.

According to the Beresford Centennial Book, the newspaper was at the "end of its string" when it was taken over by Harry Sturges.  Later, he was said to have sold out his interests in the paper to his younger brother, H. A. Sturges.  By the start of the newspaper's fourth volume 1897, it was published in Beresford, South Dakota under the title, Union County Republic before the title of the newspaper was finally changed to the Beresford Republic in 1898.

During the school year, the Beresford High School newspaper, the Beresonian, is published as part of the Beresford Republic.

References

External links
Beresford Republic entry on the South Dakota Newspaper Association website

Newspapers published in South Dakota